Anne Trabant-Haarbach (born 1 January 1949) is a German former footballer who played as a midfielder. She made eight appearances for the Germany national team from 1982 to 1983.

References

External links
 

1949 births
Living people
German women's footballers
Women's association football midfielders
Germany women's international footballers
Place of birth missing (living people)